Vlad Alexandru Achim (born 7 April 1989) is a Romanian professional footballer who plays as a midfielder for Liga I club FC U Craiova 1948.

Achim spent most of his professional career with Ceahlăul Piatra Neamț, for which he appeared in 162 first division matches between 2008 and 2015. Among others, he also represented FCSB and Viitorul Constanța, where he won three domestic trophies combined.

Club career
On 8 December 2016, Achim scored his first goal in European competitions in a UEFA Europa League group stage 1–2 loss of FC Steaua București to Villarreal.

In 2018, he rejoined Viitorul Constanța.

On 18 August 2020, Achim signed a two-years contract with Dinamo București.

International career
Achim got his first call-up to the senior Romania squad in a UEFA Euro 2016 qualifying against Greece in September 2014, but did not register his debut.

Honours
Ceahlăul Piatra Neamț
Liga II: 2008–09, 2010–11

FCSB
Cupa Ligii: 2015–16

Viitorul Constanța
Cupa României: 2018–19
Supercupa României: 2019

References

External links

1989 births
Living people
Sportspeople from Constanța
Romanian footballers
Association football midfielders
Liga I players
Liga II players
Liga III players
CSM Ceahlăul Piatra Neamț players
FC Viitorul Constanța players
FC Voluntari players
FC Steaua București players
FC Botoșani players
FC Dinamo București players
FC U Craiova 1948 players